East was a constituency of the European Parliament in Ireland. It elected 3 Members of the European Parliament (MEPs) using the single transferable vote form of proportional representation (PR-STV).

History and boundaries
The constituency was created for the 2004 election and was a successor to the Leinster constituency. From 2004 to 2009, it comprised the Leinster counties excluding the Dublin constituency. For the 2009 election, the counties of Longford and Westmeath were transferred from East to the North-West constituency. It then comprised the counties Carlow, Kildare, Kilkenny, Laois, Louth, Meath, Offaly, Wexford and Wicklow.

For the 2014 European Parliament election the constituency was abolished, with the northern part (Kildare, Laois, Louth, Meath, Offaly) transferred to the new Midlands–North-West constituency, and the southern part (Carlow, Kilkenny, Wexford, Wicklow) transferred to the South constituency.

MEPs

Elections

2009 election

2004 election

See also
European Parliament constituencies in the Republic of Ireland

References

External links
East MEPs – European Parliament Office in Ireland

European Parliament constituencies in the Republic of Ireland (historic)
2004 establishments in Ireland
Constituencies established in 2004
2014 disestablishments in Ireland
Constituencies disestablished in 2014